The men's 200 metres event at the 1955 Pan American Games was held at the Estadio Universitario in Mexico City on 15 and 16 March.

Medalists

Results

Heats
Held on 15 March

Semifinals
Held on 15 March

Final
Held on 16 March

References

Athletics at the 1955 Pan American Games
1955